The 2014 NAB AFL Under 18 Championships was the 19th edition of the AFL Under 18 Championships. Eight teams competed in the championships: Vic Metro, Vic Country, South Australia and Western Australia in Division 1, and New South Wales/Australian Capital Territory (NSW/ACT), Northern Territory, Queensland and Tasmania in Division 2. The competition was played over five rounds across two divisions.  South Australia and New South Wales/Australian Capital Territory (NSW/ACT) were the Division 1 and Division 2 champions, respectively. The Larke Medal (for the best player in Division 1) was awarded to Vic Metro's Christian Petracca, and the Hunter Harrison Medal (for the best player in Division 2) was won by NSW/ACT midfielder Isaac Heeney.

Results

Division 1

Division 1 Ladder

Division 2

Division 2 Ladder

All-Australian team
The 2014 Under 18 All-Australian team was named on 4 July 2014:

References

Under-18